St Austell station is a Grade II listed station which serves the town of St Austell, Cornwall, England. The station is operated by Great Western Railway, as is every other station in Cornwall.

The station is situated on the hillside just above the town. The main buildings were rebuilt in 2001 and face the town's bus station.

The station is served by both local and long-distance trains, including the Night Riviera sleeper service.

History
St Austell opened with the Cornwall Railway on 4 May 1859. A report when the station opened stated that

The goods shed was adjacent to the road which passed over the line on a level crossing. This was not authorised by the original Act of Parliament but was deemed unavoidable unless the road was given a very steep bridge to climb over the line. Palace Road was built along the back of the station in 1862 to make it possible for traffic from the east of the town to avoid the level crossing. The level crossing was finally closed on 21 September 1931. Road traffic now needs to cross the line on the bridge at the other end of the station, but a footbridge allows foot traffic to still cross the line at the old place.

A large warehouse was added on the town side of the line in 1862 (where St Austell Bus Station now stands), financed by selling the land to a third party who then leased it back to the company. It was replaced by a large new goods depot (200 feet long by 40 feet wide) a short distance east of the station on 2 November 1931. For many years the original goods yard was used by Motorail trains which carried cars to Cornwall from London and many other places in England.

As well as the general traffic for a busy town, the station handled large volumes of china clay from the surrounding district, and of fish from Mevagissey. The steep hill from the town to the station caused problems for the horses hauling heavy wagons.

The Cornwall Railway was amalgamated into the Great Western Railway on 1 July 1889. The Great Western Railway was nationalised into British Railways from 1 January 1948 which was in privatised in the 1990s.

A listed GWR covered footbridge which dated from 1882 linked the platforms but was superseded by an accessible bridge in 2015. The old bridge remained in place but out of use until February 2019 when it was given to the Helston Railway by Network Rail.

Stationmasters

Joseph Hall Coggins ca. 1861 - 1862
John Hussey 1862 - 1863
Mr Holt from 1864
Robert Pearce until 1871
John Brewer 1871 - 1886 (afterwards station master at )
Daniel Bailey 1886 - 1904 (formerly station master at Bodmin Road, afterwards station master at Plymouth)
Thomas Cobourne 1904 - 1916
A. Gilpin 1916
Daniel Silvester 1917 - 1922 (formerly station master at )
A.F. Davey 1922 - 1940
Frank Trewin 1941 - ca. 1947
S.H. Woodward from 1950 (formerly station master at Moreton)
R.J. Cox 1954 - 1955
J.W. Tett 1956 - 1957 (afterwards station master at )

Facilities

The main building is on the south side of the line, nearest the town centre and facing the bus station. It was built in 2001 to a design by Lacie Hickie Caley. and contains a booking office and shop.  The wooden building on this platform dates from Great Western Railway days. The station car park is situated behind this platform. An accessible footbridge links the two platforms.

At the east end of the platform is a road bridge carrying Carlyon Road over the line and beyond this is a small cutting which is spanned by a footbridge. The original bridge survived for almost 150 years; it was extended when the extra line was laid in 1931 to the new goods yard, but both sections have now been replaced by Network Rail's prototype modular fibre reinforced polymer footbridge.

Platform layout 

Passenger volume
St Austell is the fourth busiest station in Cornwall after Truro, Penzance and St Ives. Comparing the year April 2011 to March 2012 with that which started in April 2002, passenger numbers increased by 75%.

The statistics cover twelve month periods that start in April.

Services

Some trains run through to or from London Paddington station via , including the Night Riviera overnight sleeping car service.

Signalling 

St Austell was a passing place from the opening of the Cornwall Railway and rudimentary signalling was provided operated, as was usual at the time, by men who had to walk between the different signals and points, and the level crossing at the west end of the platform.  A signal box was eventually provided at the west end of the station on the south side of the line.

The line was doubled towards Par on 15 October 1893 and towards Burngullow on 26 March 1899.  Around 1905 a new Great Western Railway Type 7C signal box was built on the opposite side of the line.  A new goods yard was opened east of the station and the level crossing was closed on 2 November 1931 when a new 43-lever frame was provided in the signal box.

The signal box closed on 22 March 1980 when control of trains through the station was transferred to the signal box at Par.

Viaducts

Just to the west of St Austell are two viaducts, both originally built on stone piers with timber tops, they were rebuilt in stone in 1898 - 1899. The first is known as St Austell Viaduct. It is 720 feet long and crosses 115 feet above the Trenance valley. The second is Gover Viaduct, 95 feet high and 690 feet long on 10 piers.

References

Railway stations in Cornwall
Former Great Western Railway stations
Railway stations in Great Britain opened in 1859
Railway stations served by Great Western Railway
Railway stations served by CrossCountry
St Austell
Grade II listed buildings in Cornwall
DfT Category C2 stations